Park Bulvar is a multi-story shopping mall located on Baku Boulevard, downtown Baku, Azerbaijan. 

The mall is located less than a mile away from Sahil Metro station of Baku Subway and Government House of Baku.
It consists of six floors, including two underground floors. The general area of the mall is 17,000 square metres. It also has a parking lot for 550 automobiles. The mall was built by Baku Plaza Ltd. for $41.5 million on 7,500 square metres of land. The mall contains about 99 stores ranging from 50 square metres to 370 metres in size, one large 1,207 square metre supermarket, 6 hall movie theatre, planetarium and 3D cinema, "Happy Land" children's playground, photo studio, VIP restaurants overlooking the Baku Bay of Caspian Sea, bowling halls, food courts, etc.
The first and second floors feature luxury shops and cafes. The mall has various restaurants offering Turkish, Russian, Italian, Chinese, Mexican and Azerbaijani cuisine. The opening of the mall was attended by President Ilham Aliyev and his family. Since its opening the mall has created over 700 jobs.

References

External links
Official Website of Park Bulvar
Pictures of Park Bulvar

Simon Property Group
Shopping malls established in 2010
Shopping malls in Baku
2010 establishments in Azerbaijan